The 2015 Berlin Marathon was the 42nd edition of the Berlin Marathon. The marathon took place in Berlin, Germany, on 27 September 2015 and was the fourth World Marathon Majors race of the year.

The men's race was won by Kenyan athlete Eliud Kipchoge in 2:04:00 hours and the women's race was won by Gladys Cherono of Kenya in a time of 2:19:25 hours.

Results

Men

Women

External links

42nd BMW Berlin Marathon

Berlin Marathon
Berlin Marathon
2015 in Berlin
Berlin Marathon